Apricia is a genus of spiders in the jumping spider family Salticidae. It was first described in 2016 by Richardson. , it contains 3 species, all from Australia.

Richardson placed the genus in the Salticoida clade of the subfamily Salticinae (tribe Viciriini).

References

Salticidae
Salticidae genera
Spiders of Australia